Dyscordaxis is a moth genus in the family Autostichidae. It contains the species Dyscordaxis pygmeus, which is found in the Democratic Republic of Congo (Katanga).

References

Symmocinae
Endemic fauna of the Democratic Republic of the Congo